Paul Michael Okon (born 5 April 1972) is a former Australian soccer player. He has Belgian citizenship.

He previously captained the Australian National Team and has represented Australia Olympic Football Team at the 1992 Summer Olympics in Barcelona. Okon's career began at Marconi Stallions in the old NSL in Australia. He then went on to play at many European clubs including S.S. Lazio and Fiorentina in Italy's Serie A, Vicenza Calcio in Serie B, Middlesbrough F.C. and Leeds United F.C. in the English Premiership, Club Brugge, K.V. Oostende in Belgium's Jupiler League and APOEL in the Cypriot First Division. Okon was inducted into the Australian Football Hall of Fame in 2009, for his services to football in Australia. During his time in Belgium, Okon acquired citizenship of the country.

Club career
Okon grew up in a Sydney suburb of Bossley Park. He is of German and Italian descent. He represented his high school, Patrician Brothers' College, Fairfield during his time as a teenage schoolboy and featured prominently in all teams including the A Grade squad. However, his abilities did not stop at the football pitch. He set the record for high jump at the college's annual athletics carnival in the under 16s age group which was not broken until 2004.

Okon left Marconi Stallions in 1991 for Club Brugge, and due to a series of excellent performances at sweeper won the Belgian Golden Shoe (95/96), the Belgian Jupiler league (95/96) and two Belgian Cups (94/95 and 95/96). These performances captured the attention of some of Europe's biggest clubs, and in 1996 Dino Zoff – then coach of Italian giants Lazio – flew out to Belgium to personally sign the Australian, stipulating in his contract that Okon would play sweeper and promising first team football. However, with the departure of Roberto Di Matteo to Chelsea – forcing him to play in midfield – and a succession of knee injuries (a problem caused by a misaligned pelvis, the result of a childhood car-crash) resulted in game-time being limited. While he did return for the 1999 Scudetto decider (playing in one of the final games of the season against Juventus, which Lazio lost, handing the title to A.C. Milan) that summer he departed the Roman club.

This began a turbulent chapter of Okon's career, with spells at Fiorentina, Middlesbrough, Leeds United and Vicenza before returning to the country where he made his name with Oostende in 2004. After a brief spell with APOEL in Cyprus, Okon returned to Australia.

He signed with A-League club Newcastle United Jets for the 2006–07 season. Okon fit into a well-constructed Jets side and helped then make the play-offs in 2007. Due to injury concerns, Okon decided to retire from professional football in June 2007. Okon played for amateur team West Ryde Rovers' over-35 Division 1 team in the GHFA.

Managerial career
On 24 June 2008, along with Alex Tobin, Alistair Edwards and Nicola Williams, Okon was a recipient of an inaugural three-year scholarship under the Elite Coaching Development Program led by the FFA. As part of the program, Okon spent time at Coverciano with the Italian U-23 side under Pierluigi Casiraghi in the lead up to the 2008 Olympic Games, and spent a stint studying the youth setup of PSV Eindhoven.

On 2 September 2008 Okon was appointed assistant coach to Miron Bleiberg at Gold Coast United for their inaugural season. Before taking up his new role he took up an interim coaching role at APIA Leichhardt for their 2009 NSW Premier League season.

On 30 October 2008 Okon was appointed to lead the Australian U-18 side at the Australian Youth Olympic Festival in the month of January, aimed as part of a long-term view towards establishing the team for the 2012 Olympic Games.

On 23 February 2010, Okon did not renew his contract with Gold Coast United, following the team's loss in the first round of the A-league finals. Since then he has gone away on tour with the Australian Olympic under 23 squad for a tournament in Vietnam where he was assistant coach to Aurelio Vidmar.

On 19 April 2012 it was announced he was appointed head coach of the Australia national under-20 football team and Assistant coach of the Australia Olympic football team.

On 29 August 2016, Okon was appointed the new manager of the Central Coast Mariners, signing a two-year contract. Okon replaced Tony Walmsley, who was sacked following Central Coast's FFA Cup elimination at the hands of National Premier Leagues Victoria team Green Gully SC.

In Okon's debut as Central Coast manager, the Mariners drew 3–3 with Perth Glory at Nib Stadium, after coming back from 3-0 down at half time. 
Okon achieved his first win as Central Coast manager in his fifth game in charge: a 2–1 win over defending champions Adelaide United at Hindmarsh Stadium on 6 November 2016.

On 20 March 2018 with the Mariners being at the bottom of the A League, it was announced that Okon had resigned from his position as manager of the Central Coast Mariners.

Personal life
Okon's son, Paul Junior, is also a footballer, and currently plays in the academy of Portuguese side Benfica.

National team statistics

Managerial statistics

Honours

Club
Club Brugge
Belgian Supercup: 1991, 1992, 1994
Belgian Pro League: 1995–96
Belgian Cup: 1994–95, 1995–96

Lazio
Coppa Italia: 1997–98
Supercoppa Italiana: 1998
UEFA Cup Winners' Cup: 1998–99

APOEL
Cypriot Cup: 2005–06

International
Australia
OFC U-20 Championship: 1990
OFC Nations Cup: 2000

Individual
 NSL Papasavas Medal (U-21): 1989–1990, 1990–1991
 Belgian Golden Shoe: 1995–1996
 Oceania Footballer of the Year: 1996
 The Best Golden Shoe Team (2011)

References

External links
 Oz Football profile
 
 
 
 
 

1972 births
Living people
Sportsmen from New South Wales
Australian people of German descent
Association football defenders
Association football midfielders
Association football utility players
Australian expatriate soccer players
Australian expatriate sportspeople in England
Expatriate footballers in Cyprus
Expatriate footballers in Italy
Expatriate footballers in England
Expatriate footballers in Belgium
Australia international soccer players
Australia under-20 international soccer players
Olympic soccer players of Australia
A-League Men players
Premier League players
Serie A players
Serie B players
ACF Fiorentina players
APOEL FC players
Club Brugge KV players
K.V. Oostende players
Leeds United F.C. players
Marconi Stallions FC players
Middlesbrough F.C. players
Newcastle Jets FC players
S.S. Lazio players
L.R. Vicenza players
Watford F.C. players
Belgian Pro League players
Challenger Pro League players
National Soccer League (Australia) players
Cypriot First Division players
Naturalised citizens of Belgium
Belgian people of Australian descent
Belgian people of German descent
Soccer players from Sydney
Central Coast Mariners FC non-playing staff
Marquee players (A-League Men)
Australian soccer players
Footballers at the 1992 Summer Olympics
2000 OFC Nations Cup players
2001 FIFA Confederations Cup players
Australian people of Italian descent